Anthony Scott Veitch (6 January 1914 – 23 February 1983) was an Australian writer of radio, films, novels and TV. He worked for a number of years in British film and TV. His feature credits include The Kangaroo Kid (1950) and Coast of Skeletons (1964).

References

External links

Australian writers
1983 deaths
1914 births
Australian expatriates in the United Kingdom